Giovanni de Gamerra (26 December 1742 – 29 August 1803) was an Italian cleric, a playwright, and a poet. He is best known as a prolific librettist.

Gamerra was born in Livorno, and worked from 1771 at the Teatro Regio Ducale in Milan – an important centre for opera at the time. Operas based on his librettos include Sarti's Medonte, re di Epiro and Josef Mysliveček's Il Medonte, Paisiello's Pirro, several operas by Antonio Salieri and Mozart's Lucio Silla (though this libretto was modified by Metastasio). His Erifile was set by several composers. De Gamerra is also said to have been the first translator of Mozart's Die Zauberflöte into Italian. His librettos are in the grand, orderly tradition of Metastasio, but incorporate progressive elements with enhanced use of chorus, ballet, and elaborate scenery. In 1793, aided by his reputation as a protégé of Metastasio, he was appointed as court librettist in Vienna, and he took to combining comic and serious features to please Viennese taste.

De Gamerra was politically active, and by his revolutionary attitudes incurred the wrath of Emperor Leopold II, who tried unsuccessfully to block his career. He died at Vicenza.

Bibliography
Sadie, Stanley (ed.) Mozart and his Operas, MacMillan, 2000 
Robbins Landon, H.C. (ed.) The Mozart Compendium, Thames & Hudson, 2nd edition 1996 

1742 births
1803 deaths
18th-century Italian poets
Italian male poets
18th-century Italian dramatists and playwrights
People from Livorno
Italian opera librettists
Italian male dramatists and playwrights
Wolfgang Amadeus Mozart's librettists
18th-century Italian male writers